HEPPS (EPPS) is a buffering agent used in biology and biochemistry. The pKa of HEPPS is 8.00.  It is ones of Good's buffers.

Research on mice with Alzheimer's disease-like amyloid beta plaques has shown that HEPPS can cause the plaques to break up, reversing some of the symptoms in the mice. HEPPS was reported to dissociate amyloid beta oligomers in patients' plasma samples enabling blood diagnosis of Alzheimer's disease.

See also
CAPSO
CHES
 HEPES

References

Buffer solutions
Sulfonic acids
Piperazines
Primary alcohols